Ashira (fem. "I will sing") is an Israeli Jewish rock band based in Ramat Gan. They were formed at Bar-Ilan University in 2006 by violinist Pnina Weintraub and flutist Yael Taitz. They are notable for performing exclusively for women in accordance with the Jewish law of kol isha.

Overview
Ashira was formed in 2006 by Bar-Ilan music students Pnina Weintraub and Yael Taitz. Weintraub was frustrated at having to dance behind a mechitza at school parties and Jewish holidays, so she decided to form an all-female band that would play exclusively for women, thus removing the need for separation. She and Taitz contacted Erez Barkai, a music teacher at the Yeshurun school in Petah Tikva, who introduced them to guitarist Lia Bagrish and drummer Maayan Schweitzer. They subsequently added bassist Inbar Perser and singer Hagit Tawil (later replaced with Sapir Gezber).

The band made its debut at the Israeli pub C'naan during Sukkot of 2008, and have performed at various seminaries, girl's schools, pubs, and small halls throughout Israel, as well as Bar-Ilan. In keeping with Jewish laws of modesty, they perform only for women and do not allow their concerts to be videotaped.

Musical style
Ashira plays a mix of rock, blues, and Irish folk music. Their songs, written in Hebrew, combine liturgical passages with original lyrics.

Band members
Current
Sapir Gezber – lead vocals
Lia Bagrish – guitar, vocals
Pnina Weintraub – violin, vocals
Yael Taitz – flute
Inbar Perser – bass guitar
Maayan Schweitzer – drums

Former
Hagit Tawil – lead vocals

References

External links

Jewish rock groups
Israeli rock music groups
Bar-Ilan University alumni
2006 establishments in Israel
Musical groups established in 2006
Jewish folk rock groups
Orthodox Jewish women musicians